The XII (1st Royal Saxon) Army Corps / XII AK was a Saxon corps level command of the Saxon and German Armies before and during World War I.

The Corps was formed as the Royal Saxon Corps on 1 April 1867 and headquartered in Dresden.  Initially, it commanded the 1st Royal Saxon Infantry Division in Dresden and the 2nd Royal Saxon Infantry Division in Leipzig.  After the XIX (2nd Royal Saxon) Corps was set up on 1 April 1899 as the headquarters for the western part of the Kingdom of Saxony, XII Corps was made responsible for the eastern part of the Kingdom.

The Corps was disbanded with the demobilisation of the German Army after World War I.

Franco-Prussian War 
During the Franco-Prussian War, the corps fought in the Battle of Gravelotte, the Battle of Sedan and the Siege of Paris.

Order of Battle during the Franco-Prussian War 
The organization of the XII (Royal Saxon) Corps on 18 August 1870 at the beginning of the Franco-Prussian War was as follows:

Commander: General Crown Prince Albert of Saxony
Chief of the General Staff: Lt. Col. Friedrich von Zezschwitz

23rd (1st Royal Saxon) Infantry Division - Lt. General Prince George of Saxony
24th (2nd Royal Saxon) Infantry Division - Maj. General Erwin Nehrhoff von Holderberg
Saxon Cavalry Division - Major General Franz Graf und Edler Herr zur Lippe-Weißenfeld
 12th (Royal Saxon) Field Artillery Regiment - Col. Bernhard Oskar von Funcke
 12th (Royal Saxon) Pioneer Battalion - Lt. Col. Karl Hugo Klemm
 12th (Royal Saxon) Train Battalion - Lt. Col. Edmund Schmalz

Between the wars 
On 1 April 1887 another Saxon division was formed (32nd (3rd Royal Saxon) Infantry Division headquartered in Bautzen) and assigned to the Corps.

As the German Army expanded in the latter part of the 19th Century, the XIX (2nd Royal Saxon) Corps was set up on 1 April 1899 in Leipzig as the Generalkommando (headquarters) for the western part of the Kingdom of Saxony (districts of Leipzig, Chemnitz and Zwickau).  It took over command of 24th (2nd Royal Saxon) Division and the newly formed 40th (4th Royal Saxon) Division.  Thereafter, XII Corps was responsible for the eastern part of the Kingdom.

The Corps was assigned to the II Army Inspectorate which formed the predominantly Saxon 3rd Army at the start of the First World War.

Peacetime organisation 
The 25 peacetime Corps of the German Army (Guards, I - XXI, I - III Bavarian) had a reasonably standardised organisation.  Each consisted of two divisions with usually two infantry brigades, one field artillery brigade and a cavalry brigade each.  Each brigade normally consisted of two regiments of the appropriate type, so each Corps normally commanded 8 infantry, 4 field artillery and 4 cavalry regiments.  There were exceptions to this rule:
V, VI, VII, IX and XIV Corps each had a 5th infantry brigade (so 10 infantry regiments)
II, XIII, XVIII and XXI Corps had a 9th infantry regiment
I, VI and XVI Corps had a 3rd cavalry brigade (so 6 cavalry regiments)
the Guards Corps had 11 infantry regiments (in 5 brigades) and 8 cavalry regiments (in 4 brigades).
Each Corps also directly controlled a number of other units.  This could include one or more 
Foot Artillery Regiment
Jäger Battalion
Pioneer Battalion
Train Battalion

World War I

Organisation on mobilisation 
On mobilization on 2 August 1914 the Corps was restructured.  23rd Cavalry Brigade was withdrawn to form part of the 8th Cavalry Division and the 32nd Cavalry Brigade was broken up and its regiments assigned to the divisions as reconnaissance units.  Divisions received engineer companies and other support units from the Corps headquarters.  In summary, XII Corps mobilised with 25 infantry battalions, 9 machine gun companies (54 machine guns), 8 cavalry squadrons, 24 field artillery batteries (144 guns), 4 heavy artillery batteries (16 guns), 3 pioneer companies and an aviation detachment.

Combat chronicle 
On mobilisation, XII Corps was assigned to the predominantly Saxon 3rd Army forming part of the right wing of the forces for the Schlieffen Plan offensive in August 1914 on the Western Front.  It was transferred to the 2nd Army on 14 September 1914 and to the 7th Army one day later.  It would later serve under the 5th Army and the 3rd Army again.  It was still in existence at the end of the war in Armee-Abteilung B, Heeresgruppe Herzog Albrecht von Württemberg at the extreme southern end of the Western Front.

Commanders 
The XII Corps had the following commanders during its existence:

Glossary 
Armee-Abteilung or Army Detachment in the sense of "something detached from an Army".  It is not under the command of an Army so is in itself a small Army.
Armee-Gruppe or Army Group in the sense of a group within an Army and under its command, generally formed as a temporary measure for a specific task.
Heeresgruppe or Army Group in the sense of a number of armies under a single commander.

See also 

German Army order of battle (1914)
German Army order of battle, Western Front (1918)
List of Imperial German infantry regiments
List of Imperial German artillery regiments
List of Imperial German cavalry regiments
Royal Saxon Army

References 

 Rangliste der Königlich Sächsischen Armee für das Jahr 1914 (1914), pp. 10–11

Bibliography 
 
 
 
 
 

Corps of Germany in World War I
Military units and formations established in 1867
Military units and formations disestablished in 1919